The 1992 Metro Conference men's basketball tournament was held March 13–15 at Freedom Hall in Louisville, Kentucky. 

UNC Charlotte defeated Tulane in the championship game, 64–63, to win their first Metro men's basketball tournament.

The 49ers received an automatic bid to the 1992 NCAA Tournament. Louisville, South Florida, and Tulane received at-large bids.

Format
All seven of the conference's members participated. They were seeded based on regular season conference records, with the top team earning a bye into the semifinal round. The other six teams entered into the preliminary first round.

Bracket

References

Metro Conference men's basketball tournament
Tournament
Metro Conference men's basketball tournament
Metro Conference men's basketball tournament